The West Bank closure system is a series of obstacles including permanent and partially staffed checkpoints, concrete roadblocks and barriers, metal gates, earth mounds, tunnels, trenches, and an elaborate set of permit restrictions that controls and restricts Palestinian freedom of movement.

Severe closures began following the outbreak of the First intifada in the late 1980s, when travel restrictions were tightened in the West Bank and Gaza, and Israel began requiring Gazan workers to hold permits workers from Gaza.

Rationale and impact
The Israeli government states that the system is designed to protect Israeli citizens from Palestinian terrorist attacks that have killed over 1,000 Israelis since September 2000. In addition to the partial fulfilment of these goals, the closure system has divided communities from their land and one another and restricted Palestinian access to health and education services, their places of work and sites of religious worship.

Physical makeup
The number of checkpoints and physical obstacles and their uses and locations varies. While some are located so as to restrict Palestinian access to Israeli areas, most of them "do not restrict the interaction between Israelis and Palestinians, but rather between Palestinians and Palestinians". Organizations like the United Nations Office for the Coordination of Humanitarian Affairs, who track such developments have reported a recent upward trend; increasing from 376 in August 2005 to 528, as of September 2006. Of these, 83 checkpoints were in use by IDF and/or Border Police and another were 445 unoccupied checkpoints and obstacles.

Checkpoints

Staffed checkpoints usually consist of a barrier with observation towers and other physical blocks used to control pedestrian and vehicular access. 

There are flying checkpoints which are unannounced spot-checks spontaneously erected for a period of time, often on key transportation routes at peak travelling times. In July, August and September 2006, flying checkpoints were used an average of 165 times per week.

Observation towers
These are elevated military towers to monitor/control Palestinian pedestrian and vehicular access.

Anti-vehicle barriers

Road barriers
Secures the passage of Israeli settlers on restricted roads. These fences impede Palestinians from traveling over major roads leading to the main cities. There are 25 of these in the West Bank totalling 37,600 metres.

Permit system
The permit system is complex and applied differently from region to region. A permit eases travel and reduces the risk of being turned back at a checkpoint. Permits are necessary for crossing specific checkpoints, accessing the Jordan Valley, the 'closed area' between the Green Line and the Israeli West Bank Barrier and for entering East Jerusalem.

Barrier gates

Allows restricted movement through the West Bank barrier to Palestinian lands and to Israel. Permits are required for Palestinians to pass through a gate. Thirty-eight of the seventy-three Barrier gates are open to Palestinians with appropriate permits.

See also
 Seam Zone
 West Bank Division
 Israel Border Police

References

External links
 Report by World Bank Technical Team on Movement and Access Restrictions in the West Bank
 National Lawyer's Guild Delegation
 U.N. Office for the Coordination of Humanitarian Affairs - Occupied Palestinian Territory
  OCHA oPt map of West Bank closures - Jun 06
  OCHA oPt map of East Jerusalem region closures - Jun 06
  OCHA oPt map of Nablus region closures - Jun 06
  OCHA oPt map of Tubas region closures - Jun 06
  OCHA oPt map of Salfit region closures - Jun 06
  OCHA oPt map of Ramallah region closures - Jun 06
  OCHA oPt map of Qalqiliya region closures - Jun 06
  OCHA oPt map of Jenin region closures - Jun 06
  OCHA oPt map of Hebron region closures - Jun 06
  OCHA oPt map of Bethlehem region closures - Jun 06
  OCHA oPt map of Jericho region closures - Jun 06
  OCHA oPt map of Tulkarm region closures - Jun 06

Israeli West Bank barrier